There were 1,322 individuals who were decorated by the Order of the People's hero of Yugoslavia between 1942 and 1973. Many busts and memorials were built in honor of each People's hero. Each of them usually had a bust in his birthplace or at the place of his death. Most of these monuments are built in figurative style, but some of them were completely abstract, e.g. monument of Ivo Lola Ribar, built at Glamoč field in 1962.

Monument list

See also
People's Heroes of Yugoslavia monuments
People's Heroes of Yugoslavia monuments in Bosnia and Herzegovina
People's Heroes of Yugoslavia monuments in Croatia
List of Yugoslav World War II monuments and memorials
List of World War II monuments and memorials in Bosnia and Herzegovina
List of World War II monuments and memorials in Croatia
List of World War II monuments and memorials in North Macedonia
List of World War II monuments and memorials in Serbia
List of World War II monuments and memorials in Slovenia

Serbia
Yugoslav culture
People's Heroes of Yugoslavia monuments
Serbian military monuments and memorials